William Warren Tunnicliffe (April 22, 1922 – September 12, 1996) is credited by Charles Goldfarb as being the first person (1967) to articulate the idea of separating the definition of formatting from the structure of content in electronic documents (separation of presentation and content).

In September 1967, during a meeting at the Canadian Government Printing Office, Tunnicliffe gave a presentation on the separation of information content of documents from their format. In the 1970s, Tunnicliffe led the development of a standard called GenCode for the publishing industry.  He served as the first chair of the International Organization for Standardization committee that developed the first international standard for markup languages, ISO 8879.

Tunnicliffe was a member and former chairman of the Printing Industries of America, and held the rank of captain in the US Navy and Navy Reserves until 1982.

See also
Markup language

References

Sources
 The SGML Handbook, Goldfarb, pg 567, on the Generic Coding Concept.

External links
 SGML: In memory of William W. Tunnicliffe

1922 births
1996 deaths
United States Navy captains
United States Navy reservists
Worcester Polytechnic Institute alumni
Harvard University alumni
20th-century American engineers